This is a list of the on-air team members for the ITV Breakfast programme Good Morning Britain which began broadcasting in the United Kingdom on 28 April 2014.
 
Good Morning Britain launched on 28 April 2014 following the cancellation of Daybreak with seven main presenters – Susanna Reid, Kate Garraway, Ben Shephard, Charlotte Hawkins, Ranvir Singh, Sean Fletcher and John Stapleton, with weather bulletins presented by Laura Tobin, entertainment news delivered by Richard Arnold and sports news presented by Fletcher.

Reid, Shephard and Hawkins all presented four days a week, with Fletcher presenting every day, Stapleton presenting every Wednesday, Garraway presenting every Thursday and Singh presenting every Friday. Garraway and Singh also acted as relief presenters.

In January 2015, the show received a shake which meant that the show went down to just two main presenters with one newsreader. Shephard and Reid remained the main presenters with Reid continuing to present everyday except Friday and Shephard continuing to present everyday except Wednesday. Garraway began presenting on Wednesdays and Fridays while also taking the newsreader position on Mondays and Tuesdays. Stapleton read the news on Wednesdays with Singh taking the position on Thursdays and Fridays. Fletcher acted as a relief presenter and newsreader.

In June 2015, following a six-month absence due to maternity leave, Hawkins returned to the show as a newsreader Monday-Wednesday and also acts as a main presenter in the absence of Reid, Shephard or Garraway.
 
In September 2015, Shephard confirmed he would cut his days down to just two days a week presenting on Thursdays and Fridays. Garraway began presenting everyday except Thursday.
 
In November of the same year, Piers Morgan joined the show as a main presenter alongside Reid presenting Monday-Wednesday.
 
From November 2015-March 2021, the main presenting line-up of Morgan, Reid, Shephard and Garraway remained the same with just the newsreaders occasionally switching positions.

In August 2017, Richard Madeley joined the show as a relief presenter. In August 2018, Adil Ray also joined as a relief presenter. Madeley and Ray mainly present during school holidays, usually alongside Garraway or other relief presenters Hawkins and Singh. 
 
From March to July 2020, due to the COVID-19 pandemic, sister show Lorraine was cancelled so presenter Lorraine Kelly joined as the host of the new fourth hour of Good Morning Britain.
 
In March 2021, following comments Morgan made about Meghan Markle, he left the programme. Relief presenters Madeley and Ray and various guest presenters replaced his slot alongside Reid.

In June 2021, Martin Lewis joined the show as a presenter, followed by Ed Balls in November 2021, with them both becoming part of a team of presenters rotating to replace Piers’ former slot, alongside Madeley, who signed a £300,000 contract the same month to become a permanent presenter. Robert Rinder also joined as a relief presenter.

Presenters

Main

Relief

Former

Guest

Newsreaders

Relief

Other significant studio-based on-air staff

Relief

News correspondents & reporter producers

Yearly presenter schedule

References

 

Good Morning Britain